Sampleite has a general formula of NaCaCu5(PO4)4Cl•5(H2O).  It was first described in 1942 for an occurrence in Chuquicamata, Chile and was named after Mat Sample, a mine superintendent for the Chile Exploration Company.

Sampleite is monoclinic. It belongs to the space group P21/n or P21/c. In a thin section it has a high surface relief and will have sharp boundaries with the surrounding medium. Sampleite is anisotropic and has visible pleochroism and birefringence.

It is characteristically found in earthy crusts in a highly sericitized rock and is present in highly oxidized conditions near the surface. When it occurs as micaceous rosettes and aggregates it can be associated with dendrites of manganese and iron oxides. Sampleite appears to be the most recent mineral deposited with the exception of gypsum.

References

External links

Calcium minerals
Copper(II) minerals
Halide minerals
Phosphate minerals
Sodium minerals
Monoclinic minerals
Minerals in space group 14